Ihlathi Secondary School is a high school that is located in the suburb of Tshabalala, Bulawayo, Zimbabwe. It also educates students from the neighbouring suburbs including Sizinda and Nkulumane.

The school was established in 1968 as a junior secondary school under the F2 group of schools which had a curriculum oriented in the technical subjects. The name Ihlathi means a dense forest. In 1980, the new government did away with the F1 and F2 education systems for secondary schools nationwide, Ihlathi Secondary School started offering Cambridge G.C.E. "O"Level curriculum. The first class of students wrote their exaninations in November 1983.

References

Education in Bulawayo
High schools in Zimbabwe
Educational institutions established in 1968
1968 establishments in Rhodesia